The flag of Saba was adopted on December 6, 1985 (national day of the island).  130 different designs were presented to the commission.  The chosen flag was designed by an 18-year-old Saban named Edmond Daniel Johnson.

Saba accepted Dutch sovereignty after 1816 and used the Dutch flag.  However, since some islanders considered Saba a "republic", they added a special symbol – a green cabbage — to emphasize their independence, and this symbol was used probably until about the 1920s.

Notes

Flag
Flags of the Netherlands Antilles
Flags introduced in 1985